Susanne Profanter (born 30 April 1970) is an Austrian former judoka. She competed in the women's half-middleweight event at the 1992 Summer Olympics.

References

External links
 

1970 births
Living people
Austrian female judoka
Olympic judoka of Austria
Judoka at the 1992 Summer Olympics
People from Kufstein
Sportspeople from Tyrol (state)
20th-century Austrian women